Jerome Patrick Flynn (born 16 March 1963) is an English actor and singer. He is best known for his roles as Paddy Garvey of the King's Fusiliers in the ITV series Soldier Soldier, Bronn in the hit HBO series Game of Thrones, and Bennet Drake in Ripper Street.

He and his Soldier Soldier co-star Robson Green also performed as Robson & Jerome in the latter half of the 1990s. They released a version of "Unchained Melody", which stayed at number 1 for 7 weeks on the UK Chart, selling more than a million copies and becoming the best-selling single of 1995. The duo had two further number 1 singles: "I Believe" and "What Becomes of the Brokenhearted". Their eponymous debut album and the follow-up Take Two both reached number 1 on the UK Albums Chart.

Early life 
Flynn was born on 16 March 1963 in Bromley, Kent (now part of Greater London), the son of actor and singer Eric Flynn, who was born on Hainan Island in China, and drama teacher Fern Flynn. He has a brother, actor Daniel Flynn, a sister; and a half-sister and a half-brother, musician and actor Johnny Flynn, from his father's second marriage.

Career

In 1986, Flynn appeared in the LWT television film London's Burning as firefighter Kenny "Rambo" Baines. When the film spawned a series of the same name in 1988, he was unable to reprise his role due to previous commitments. Also in 1986, he played a minor role as the soldier "Franny" in "The Monocled Mutineer".In 1988 he played the character Freddie in the ITV drama; The Fear which was about the London underworld.  He appeared as D.S Eddie Hargreaves for six episodes of the British Academy Television Award (BAFTA) winning police drama, Between The Lines between 1992 and 1994.

Flynn portrayed Corporal Paddy Garvey of the King's Fusiliers in the ITV series Soldier Soldier. The series began in 1991. He acted alongside Robson Green in the series. After Flynn and Green performed Unchained Melody on the programme, ITV was inundated by people looking to buy the song, and the pair were persuaded by record producer Simon Cowell to record it and release it as a single, a double A-side with White Cliffs of Dover. The single was released under the name Robson & Jerome and reached number one in the UK chart in 1995. It stayed at No.1 for 7 weeks in the UK Singles Chart, selling more than 1.9 million copies and making it the best-selling single of the year, and winning the duo the Music Week Awards in 1996 for best single and best album. The duo had two more number one hits in 1995 and 1996 with "I Believe" and "What Becomes of the Brokenhearted" both re-makes of standards, they also produced two number one albums.

In 1997, Soldier Soldier ended. Flynn went on to star as Eddie Wallis (alongside singing partner Robson Green) in the comedy-drama Ain't Misbehavin'''.

In 1999, Flynn starred in the short-lived police show Badger, played real-life soccer player Bobby Charlton film  Best, played Tommy Cooper in Jus' Like That, a tribute to the comic magician written by John Fisher and directed by Simon Callow.

In 2007, Flynn having semi-retired from acting and moved to Pembrokeshire, directed and starred in the low budget film Rude Tales. The film was split into a series of short stories centred in the lead character, Jerome Rude, played by Flynn. The film was screened at a small number of independent cinemas in the Pembrokeshire area.

In July 2010, after almost 10 years away from acting,  it was confirmed that Flynn would be playing the role of Bronn in the HBO television series Game of Thrones, based on the A Song of Ice and Fire novels of George R. R. Martin.

Flynn provides the voice of Daniel (the hound) in the children's television show Tommy Zoom.

Flynn stars alongside Matthew Macfadyen in four series of Ripper Street for the BBC.

In 2016,  Flynn appeared in "Shut Up and Dance", an episode of the anthology series Black Mirror.

In 2019, in an interview, Flynn revealed that he'd been cast in Amazon Prime Video's upcoming series adaptation of Stephen King's The Dark Tower series in an unannounced role.

In 2021, Flynn portrayed Neil Wallis specialist in crisis management in the BBC1 drama The Trick based on the true story around Climategate.

In 2022 he starred along side Harrison Ford & Hellen Mirren in Taylor Sheridan’s “1923” a spin off from the “Yellowstone” series with Kevin Costner. Flynn plays Scottish sheep farmer, Banner Creighton.

 Filmography 
 Film 

 Television 
{| class="wikitable sortable"
! Year
! Title
! Role
! class="unsortable" | Notes
|-
| 1985
| American Playhouse| Kurt
| 1 episode ('Displaced Person')
|-
| 1986
| Screen Two| Nigel
| Episode: 'The Russian Soldier'
|-
| 1986
| The Monocled Mutineer| Franny
| 2 episodes ('When the Hurly-Burly's Done', 'Before the Shambles')
|-
| 1986
| Breaking Up| John Mailer
|
|-
| 1986
| London's Burning: The Movie| Kenny 'Rambo' Baines
| TV movie
|-
| 1988
| Troubles| Matthews
| TV miniseries
|-
| 1988
| The Fear| Freddie
|
|-
| 1989
| Flying Lady| Benny Barton
| 1 episode ('The Trip')
|-
| 1990
| Bergerac| Alan Bruton
| 1 episode ('Under Wraps')
|-
| 1991
| Casualty| Alan Deacon
| 1 episode ("Living in Hope")
|-
| 1991
| Boon| Chris Shepley
| 1 episode ("Lie of the Land")
|-
| 1991–1995
| Soldier Soldier| Patrick "Paddy" Garvey
|
|-
| 1992
| Between the Lines| Eddie Hargreaves
| 6 episodes
|-
| 1993
| Don't Leave Me This Way| Tony Fleming
| TV movie
|-
| 1995
| A Mind to Murder| Peter Nagle
| TV movie
|-
| 1997
| Ain't Misbehavin'| Eddie Wallis
| TV miniseries
|-
| 1999
| The Ruth Rendell Mysteries| Martin Urban
| 1 episode ("The Lake of Darkness")
|-
| 1999–2000
| Badger| Tom McCabe
|
|-
| 2007
| Tommy Zoom| Daniel
| Voice role
|-
| 2011–2019
| Game of Thrones| Bronn
| 36 episodes
|-
| 2012–2016
| Ripper Street| Bennet Drake
| 31 episodes
|-
| 2016
|Black Mirror| Hector
| Episode: "Shut Up and Dance"
|-
| 2022
| 1923| Banner Creighton
| Miniseries
|-
|TBC
|The Change|
| TV series
|}

 Awards and nominations 

 Personal life 
Vegetarian since the age of 18, Flynn is a patron of the Vegetarian Society and Compassion in World Farming. He has joined PETA in advocating the vegan lifestyle. In December 2018, Flynn joined the board of directors of VeganNation, an Israeli-based vegan lifestyle project that aims to create an ‘international vegan economy based on a virtual currency, the VeganCoin.” 
Having taken childhood holidays in Pembrokeshire, Wales with his family, as a then follower of Ratu Bagus, a form of meditation, Flynn and some friends moved to a Georgian house there in the late 1990s, where he still lived in 2014.

In the height of his Soldier Soldier and music career, Flynn was in a relationship with Anna Jacobs. An actor friend introduced him to the works of the American spiritual guru Andrew Cohen, which he then followed. In the mid 90s, Anna sadly miscarried the couples twins four months into her pregnancy,

Flynn was in a relationship with Game of Thrones'' co-star Lena Headey; rumours spread about the relationship ending on bad terms some time before March 2014, resulting in the couple being kept apart on-set. However, Flynn rebuffed the claims, stating he and Headey had worked in a scene together, adding "And the last time I saw Lena we were speaking, so I wouldn’t believe everything you read, and like I said, [the media] can get pretty desperate for stories." He continued by calling Headey "…a wonderful person and a wonderful actress."

References

External links 
 

1963 births
Living people
20th-century English male actors
21st-century English male actors
Alumni of the Royal Central School of Speech and Drama
British vegetarianism activists
English male film actors
English male television actors
English pop singers
Male actors from Kent
Musicians from Kent
People associated with the Vegetarian Society
People from Bromley